Stompers RFC is a Maltese rugby club based in Sliema. They currently compete in the Malta Rugby Union Championship.

History
The club was founded in 1996.

In season 2015/16, the club signed an agreement with the Kunsill Studenti Universitarji and the Malta University Sports Club to create a reserve team with players drafted from students of the University of Malta. This saw an influx of players, some of whom were eventually called up to the senior team, such as Thomas Bugeja and Andre Farrugia, and for Isaac Bezzina, a former Maltese judo champion, even came a call up to the Malta national rugby union team. Another reserve, Gayle Lynn Callus, entered club management the year after, being elected into committee for a 2016-2018 term.

Squads

First Team

2018-19

Players in bold capped internationally.

External links
 Stompers RFC

Maltese rugby union teams
Rugby clubs established in 1996